Aulacoseirales is an order of diatoms belonging to the class Bacillariophyceae. The order consists only one family: Aulacoseiraceae.

Genera
Genera:
 Alveolophora A.I.Moisseeva & T.L.Nevretdinova, 1990
 Aulacoseira G.H.K.Thwaites, 1848
 †Eoseira A.P.Wolfe & M.B.Edlund, 2005
 Pseudoaulacosira G.Lupikina & G.K.Khursevich, 1991
 Strangulonema R.K.Greville, 1865

References

Bacillariophyceae
Diatom orders